Krzysztof Szubarga (born 5 July 1984) is a Polish professional basketball coach and former player. Standing at 1.78 m (5'10") tall, he mainly plays at the point guard position. He is currently working as head coach for Arka Gdynia of the PLK.

Professional career
Szubarga has the majority of his career in the Polish Basketball League. He broke into the league as a 17-year-old and saw action off the bench in the 2001–02 with Inowrocław KS Noteć.  Since that time, he has played for several teams and helped Polpak Świecie to a third-place league finish in 2005–06.  He played his most recent season, 2008–09, for Stal Ostrów Wielkopolski and averaged a career high 12.3 points, 3.5 rebounds, and 4.5 assists per game.

National team career
Szubarga was also a member of the senior Polish national basketball team.  He was selected to play for the host Polish team at the EuroBasket 2009, his first appearance in a major tournament for the national team.

Coaching career
Following retirement, he has started his coaching career by becoming assistant coach for Arka Gdynia of the PLK. On 29 July 2022 he was announced as the new head coach for the Arka Gdynia.

References

1984 births
Living people
Arka Gdynia basketball coaches
Asseco Gdynia players
AZS Koszalin players
KK Włocławek players
MBC Mykolaiv players
People from Inowrocław
Point guards
Polish men's basketball players
Sportspeople from Kuyavian-Pomeranian Voivodeship
Stal Ostrów Wielkopolski players